The KHL Junior Draft is a collective meeting in which the franchises of the Kontinental Hockey League systematically select the rights to available amateur players who meet the eligibility requirements to play professional hockey in the KHL. Over the seasons, the format has followed a set pattern and variable numbers of players have been taken in each season. 

Seven players have been taken first. Of those, six players have been Russian in nationality, and one Czech.

First overall picks

Key

Kontinental Hockey League Junior Draft
First overall draft picks